The Original Hockey Hall of Fame, formerly the International Hockey Hall of Fame, was founded on September 10, 1943, in Kingston, Ontario, Canada. On April 25, 1941, a report in the Montreal Gazette stated that the movement to establish the Hall of Fame was "started by Fred Corcoran to have something similar for hockey now that baseball and golf have their own hall of fame." With the movement started a city would need to be named to house the Hall of Fame. Kingston was chosen thanks to James T. Sutherland’s passionate argument that Kingston was the birthplace of hockey stating: 
There may be some who still claim sundry and diverse places as being the authentic spot or locality. Whatever measure of merit the claim of other places may have, I think it is generally admitted and has been substantially proven on many former occasions that the actual birthplace of organized hockey is the city of Kingston, in the year 1888.

With the establishment of the Hall of Fame, it became the first sports Hall of Fame in Canada. However, establishing a permanent building for the Hall of Fame became delayed by bureaucracy and lack of building funds. With no facility competed by 1958, the President of the National Hockey League Clarence Campbell withdrew the league's support of the Kingston-based Hall of Fame. Campbell decided instead to establish the NHL’s own Hockey Hall of Fame in Toronto, Ontario. The Hall of Fame honoured 40 members before the National Hockey League removed its support; these first 40 members of the Hall of Fame were recognized in the new Hockey Hall of Fame. In 1966, the Hall of Fame honoured two more members (Busher Jackson and Bun Cook), who were the last to gain this honour. These two were also inducted into the Toronto Hockey Hall of Fame, although at later dates: Jackson in 1971, and Cook in 1995.

Members

† Names appear in similar fashion to the way in which they are displayed at the International Hockey Hall of Fame.

References

External links
Original Hockey Hall of Fame official website

Original Hall of Fame
Original Hockey